Paweł Bielec  (20 March 1902 in Dynów - 16 November 2002 in Krakow) was a Polish photographer and painter.

He opened his first studio in Lviv in 1928, on Grodzka Street, and then at University street. In 1938 he moved to Krakow where he lived for many years and created the noted photographic company Photo Bielec.

1902 births
2002 deaths
People from Dynów
People from the Kingdom of Galicia and Lodomeria
20th-century Polish painters
20th-century Polish male artists
Photographers from Kraków
Polish centenarians
Photographers from Lviv
Polish male painters
Men centenarians